As per the 2011 census of India, Andhra Pradesh (post reorganisation) has an overall literacy rate of 67.35% (males 74.77%, females 59.96%), significantly lower than the overall national average of 74.04%. Among the Indian states and union territories, it stands at 32nd position. During the same census, there are a total of  literates:  males and  females. While, in terms of district-wise literacy rates, West Godavari stands top with 74.32% and Vizianagaram at bottom with 58.89%. The government also implements fee reimbursement scheme for the economically backward sections of the state.

Primary and secondary education 

The School Education Department of Andhra Pradesh, the largest department of the state, manages and regulates schools in various districts of the state. The primary and secondary school education is imparted by government, aided and private schools. These schools are categorized as urban, rural and residential schools. As per the child info and school information report (2018–19), there were a total of  students, enrolled in  schools respectively. As per the students appeared for the Secondary School Certificate exam (2005), a majority of the students preferred Telugu and English as the medium of instruction. While, Urdu, Odia, Tamil, Kannada and Hindi were opted by a few.

The Andhra Pradesh Board of Secondary Education (Directorate of Government Examinations) administers the Secondary School Certificate (SSC) examination. For the 2019 SSC exam, more than  students have appeared and recorded an overall pass percentage of 94.88%, a little increase from 94.48% of the previous year. In terms of district-wise pass percentage, East Godavari stood at the top with 98.19% and Nellore at the bottom with 83.19%. Schools which recorded a 100% pass percentage were 5,464, out of 11,000.

Higher education 
Higher education in Andra Pradesh

See also 
 Telugu language policy
 List of institutions of higher education in Andhra Pradesh

References